Marc Eberle (born 3 June 1980) is a German former professional footballer who played as a defender.

External links 
 

1980 births
Living people
Sportspeople from Aachen
German footballers
Footballers from North Rhine-Westphalia
Association football defenders
Eerste Divisie players
Belgian Pro League players
Cypriot First Division players
South African Premier Division players
Roda JC Kerkrade players
K. Patro Eisden Maasmechelen players
VVV-Venlo players
K.F.C. Dessel Sport players
Lierse S.K. players
Lommel S.K. players
Aris Limassol FC players
Mpumalanga Black Aces F.C. players
MVV Maastricht players
RKVV EVV players
EHC Hoensbroek players
German expatriate footballers
German expatriate sportspeople in the Netherlands
Expatriate footballers in the Netherlands
German expatriate sportspeople in Belgium
Expatriate footballers in Belgium
German expatriate sportspeople in Cyprus
Expatriate footballers in Cyprus
German expatriate sportspeople in South Africa
Expatriate soccer players in South Africa